East Cobb Baseball is a baseball program/complex located in the suburbs of the metro Atlanta area, United States that, as of 2007, was one of metro Atlanta's highest earners. The founder and owner of the team is Guerry Baldwin, with Bill Clements a founding coach. Its tournaments are known for drawing the regions top players.

History
East Marietta National Little League won the Little League World Series in 1983 and were coached by Richard Hilton. The majority of the players from that team joined the first East Cobb team the following year as 13-year-olds and were coached by Guerry Baldwin, who spearheaded the nationally renowned program.

The program was established in 1985. Russ Umphenhour, who is an entrepreneur, noticed Baldwin's success with his players and old club. This sparked the idea of building a complex for developing youth baseball players.

The Complex
The complex is home to 80+ teams including the East Cobb Twins, East Cobb Yankees, East Cobb Prime, East Cobb Colt 45's, East Cobb Tigers, East Cobb Rangers, East Cobb Braves, East Cobb Bandits, East Cobb Cubs, East Cobb Patriots, and Team East Cobb, among others. It was further renovated in 2021.

References

External links

Baseball in Atlanta